EBD may refer to:

 on-board diagnostics, an automotive term referring to a vehicle's self-diagnostic
 end of business day, end of day